The Cambridge subway, also known as the Cambridge tunnel, or later the Cambridge–Dorchester line, was the heavy-rail rapid-transit line between Park Street Under in Boston and Harvard Square in Cambridge, Massachusetts, that became the backbone of the MBTA Red Line.

History

Opened in 1912 with all stations underground, the line included tunnels on both sides of the Charles River and an above-ground section on the recently built Cambridge Bridge (now Longfellow Bridge) across the Charles River.  At the Boston end of the bridge, the Boston Elevated Railway built a new elevated structure to near Lindall Place, where the tracks entered the new Beacon Hill tunnel constructed by the Boston Transit Commission, connecting to the southern terminus under the Park Street station of the Tremont Street subway.

Shortly after the line opened, work on extensions to South Station and to Andrew Square, Dorchester, was undertaken; the Dorchester Tunnel to Andrew Square opened July 1, 1917.  The Dorchester extension (beyond Dorchester) opened in stages, starting in 1927, as far as Ashmont station by 1928.

Terminology

When the line was opened in March 1912 to a new station below Park Street station, the new station was dubbed "Park Street Under", the first use of this "Under" terminology.

The line has also been called the Cambridge–Park Street Under subway.

In 1965, the "Harvard–Ashmont run" was rebranded the Red Line.

References

Red Line (MBTA)